Ferdinand Canu (1863–1932) was a French paleontologist and author. In 1923 he was awarded Daniel Giraud Elliot Medal for his work North American Later Tertiary and Quaternary Bryozoa.

Works
1917 – A synopsis of American Early Tertiary Cheilostome Bryozoa 
1918 – Bryozoa of the Canal Zone and Related Areas
1919 – Contributions to the Geology and Paleontology of the West Indies

1921 – Bryozoa of the Philippine Region
1923 – North American Later Tertiary and Quaternary Bryozoa
1931 – Bryozoaires oligocènes de la Belgique conservés au Musée royal d'histoire naturelle de Belgique
1933 – The Bryozoan Fauna of the Vincentown Limesand

References

1863 births
1932 deaths
French paleontologists